Number One is the first DVD video release by Greek singer Helena Paparizou. It is a collection of all her music videos from the beginning of her solo career along with some extra videos. It was released one month before the final of Eurovision Song Contest 2005 where Paparizou won first place.

Album Features
"My Number One"
"Antithesis"
"Katse Kala"
"Treli Kardia"
"Anapantites Klisis"
"Stin Kardia Mou Mono Thlipsi"
"Anapantities Klisis (Mad Version)" (duet with Christos Dantis)

Extra Features
"Tribute To Sweden with Christos Nezos"
"Photo Gallery"

Release history

Charts

References

Helena Paparizou video albums
2007 video albums
Music video compilation albums
2007 compilation albums
Sony Music Greece compilation albums
Sony Music Greece video albums